The District of Columbia General Hospital was a hospital located in Washington, D.C. It was operational from 1806 to its controversial closing by mayor Anthony A. Williams in 2001, as the city was trying to cut costs while recovering from bankruptcy. At the time of its closure, it was the only public hospital located within the District.

History 
The hospital was founded as the Washington Infirmary in 1806, using a $2,000 grant from Congress, and was located at 6th and M Street NW. Originally located in Judiciary Square it moved to 19th and Massachusetts, SE in 1846. At the turn of the century, efforts to open a new public hospital at 14th and Upshur were opposed by residents. The final hospital site was first developed in the 1840s as a consolidated hospital, poorhouse and workhouse complex known as the Washington Asylum Hospital. It was renamed Gallinger Municipal Hospital in 1922, after U.S. Senator Jacob Harold Gallinger.

Washington City Paper described the hospital in 1994 as a "city poorhouse" that "provided de facto universal health care to the residents of the District... typically, only people with no alternative."

Post-closure 
Shortly after its closure, the facility was used as a homeless shelter, with a capacity of around 270 families.

In 2014, 8-year old Relisha Rudd went missing after her family was staying in the facility. In the days before her disappearance she was seen with a janitor from the facility who killed his wife and a few days after, himself. Rudd had not been found as of July 2021.

In 2016, Mayor Muriel Bowser announced a plan to replace the D.C. General shelter with six smaller facilities located around the city while transitioning families to subsidized housing. D.C. General was officially closed by Mayor Bowser on October 30, 2018.

Reservation 13, the area encompassing the hospital site, was offered as part of Washington's bid to host Amazon HQ2.

External links
National Institutes of Health website on the hospital

References

Hospital buildings completed in 1806
Hospitals established in 1806
Defunct hospitals in Washington, D.C.
1806 establishments in Washington, D.C.
2001 disestablishments in Washington, D.C.
Homeless shelters in the United States